Devyn June Puett (born November 22, 1977, in West Covina CA.) is an American actress, singer, dancer, and real estate agent. She is best known for her role as Devyn on Kids Incorporated. Devyn is the younger sister of former Life Goes On star Tommy Puett.

Acting career
Puett made her acting debut in Kidsongs under the stage name Poochie Puett. After her time on Kidsongs ended, Puett was cast as Devyn on Kids Incorporated and appeared on the series during seasons 5 and 6. As a singer, Puett was featured in the children's chorus of the hit single "Toy Soldiers", recorded by former Kids Incorporated star Martika. Late in life, she acted as Toad #2 in Super Mario Bros.

In her early twenties, Puett worked for many producers writing and recording. She sang backup vocals on Tommy's only album Life Goes On. She was in American Masters as Virginia Poe in 1995. American Masters was Puett's final acting project.

Personal life
Devyn Puett retired from acting in 1995. She graduated from Diamond Bar High School in 1996. She has been married to Josh Belville since 1998. They have three children named Hunter Rose Belville, Jackson Tucker Belville, and Hudson Ryder Belville.<ref>

References

External links

 Devyn Puett on Instagram 
 Devyn Puett on Pinterest 
 Devyn Puett on Twitter

1977 births
American child actresses
American child singers
American female dancers
Dancers from Indiana
Living people
People from Diamond Bar, California
American television actresses
People from Gary, Indiana
American real estate brokers
21st-century American singers
21st-century American actresses